Aretz Iguiniz (born 3 June 1983) is a former French rugby union player. His position was Prop and he played his entire career for Aviron Bayonnais in the Top 14.

References

1983 births
Living people
French rugby union players
Aviron Bayonnais players
Rugby union props
French-Basque people
People from Hendaye
Sportspeople from Pyrénées-Atlantiques